Her Boy Friend is a 1924 American silent comedy film featuring Oliver Hardy.

Cast
 Larry Semon as Larry, the Chief's son
 Dorothy Dwan as Iva Method, the girl detective
 Alma Bennett as The Vamp
 Oliver Hardy as Killer Kid (credited as Oliver N. Hardy)
 Fred Spencer as Headquarters Hank (credited as Fred Spence)
 Frank Alexander as Slim Chance
 Spencer Bell as Dock worker
 William Hauber

See also
 List of American films of 1924

References

External links

1924 films
American silent short films
Silent American comedy films
American black-and-white films
1924 comedy films
1924 short films
Films directed by Noel M. Smith
Films directed by Larry Semon
American comedy short films
1920s American films
1920s English-language films